Damot Sore is a woreda in Southern Nations, Nationalities, and Peoples' Region, Ethiopia. Part of the Wolayita Zone Damot Sore is bordered on the southeast by Sodo Zuria, on the west by Kindo Koysha, on the northwest by Boloso Bombe, and on the north by Boloso Sore. The administrative town of the wereda is Gununo. Damot Sore was separated from Boloso Sore woreda.

Demographics 
Based on the 2019 population projection conducted by the CSA, this woreda has a total population of 131,078, of whom 63,845 are men and 67,233 women; 6,124 or 6.08% of its population are urban dwellers. The majority of the inhabitants were Protestants, with 62.47% of the population reporting that belief, 31.15% practiced Ethiopian Orthodox Christianity, and 5.47% were Catholic.

Notes

Wolayita
Districts of the Southern Nations, Nationalities, and Peoples' Region